Tear It Down may refer to:

 Tear It Down (album), an album by My Brightest Diamond
 "Tear It Down", a Def Leppard song from the album Adrenalize